The 960s BC is a decade which lasted from 969 BC to 960 BC.

Events and trends
 967 BC—Tiglath-Pileser II becomes King of Assyria.
 967 BC—Solomon becomes king of the Israelites. (962 BC—traditional date)
 965 BC—David, king of the ancient Israelites, died.

Significant people
 Solomon becomes king of the Kingdom of Israel
 Snake Spine, Ajaw of Palenque, semi legendary (967 BC-?)
 Ashur-Dan II, king of Assyria, is born (approximate date).
 Jereboam, king of Israel, is born (approximate date).
 Rehoboam, king of Judah, is born (approximate date).

References